Bardemil (also Romanized as Bardemīl; also known as Bardeh Mīl) is a village in Shahid Modarres Rural District, in the Central District of Shushtar County, Khuzestan Province, Iran. At the 2006 census, its population was 19, in 4 families.

References 

Populated places in Shushtar County